The Societé Générale des Voitures Automobiles Otto of Paris manufactured the Otto car from 1900 to 1914, and the F.L. from 1909 to 1914.

Otto
The Otto part of the name was because the Compagnie Française de Moteurs à Gaz held the license for the Otto stationary engine for France. Early gas-engined cars were 2-cylinders of varying outputs between 6 and 12 horsepower.  The engines were either vertically- or horizontally-opposed.  In 1901, a 20 hp 4-cylinder model was added.  By 1903, a 10 hp single-cylinder model was on offer.  This model was entered via the rear of the car and engine speed was controlled via a variable lift exhaust valve.

F.L.
In 1909, the Otto company announced the arrival of a new car, the F.L., as an additional marque of the company.  This car featured a 12/16 hp monoblock 2-liter engine of four cylinders.  Unusually, the engine, flywheel, and gearbox were all a single connected unit.  Later, a 6-cylinder engine was added, with the same cylinder dimensions, which yielded an engine slightly larger than three liters.

The origin of the name is unclear, though a likely explanation is the pronunciation (eff ell) is supposed to be like that of the Eiffel Tower.

Culmen
Another related marque was the Culmen.

Notes

References
Burgess-Wise, David. The New Illustrated Encyclopedia of Automobiles.
G.N. Georgano, Nick (Ed.). The Beaulieu Encyclopedia of the Automobile. Chicago: Fitzroy Dearborn, 2000. 

Defunct motor vehicle manufacturers of France
Manufacturing companies based in Paris